The hepatitis E virus cis-reactive element is a RNA element that is believed to be essential for "some step in gene expression". The mutation of this element resulted in hepatitis E strains which were unable to infect rhesus macaques (Macaca mulatta).

References

External links 
 

Cis-regulatory RNA elements
Hepeviridae